MDH may refer to:

Chemistry
 Malate dehydrogenase
 (S)-mandelate dehydrogenase
 Methanol dehydrogenase (cytochrome c)
 Methylenedioxyhydroxyamphetamine

Health and medicine
 Manila Doctors Hospital, in Ermita, Manila, Philippines
 Mater Dei Hospital, in Msida, Malta
 Milton District Hospital, in Milton, Ontario, Canada
 Minnesota Department of Health

Other uses
 MDH (spice company), an Indian spice producer and seller
 Maguindanao language (ISO 639-3: mdh)
 Mälardalen University College (Mälardalens högskola; MdH), in Sweden
 Minimum descent height, for aircraft landing; see List of aviation, avionics, aerospace and aeronautical abbreviations
 Multidimensional hierarchical toolkit
 Southern Illinois Airport (IATA: MDH)